Richard Edgar Thompson (December 13, 1871 - 1928) was an American Democratic politician. He was a member of the Mississippi State Senate from 1916 to 1920.

Biography 
Richard Edgar Thompson was born on December 13, 1871, in Toomsuba, Mississippi. He was the son of John Daniel Thompson and Susan Jane (Camp) Thompson. He grew up in poverty and received his education from a country school. He continued to work on the farm and his father's shop until he became an assistant postmaster and railroad agent. He then served as Toomsuba's postmaster and, while serving in that office, established a Rural Free Delivery route there. Thompson was elected to represent the 14th district in the Mississippi State Senate in 1915 for the 1916–1920 term. Thompson died in 1928 in Mississippi.

Personal life 
Thompson was a Freemason and a member of the Presbyterian Church. In 1891, Thompson married Mollie Elizabeth Hurtt. In 1905, they adopted two children named Paul and Carl.

References 

1871 births
1928 deaths
People from Lauderdale County, Mississippi
Democratic Party Mississippi state senators